Bruce Springsteen and the E Street Band's Darkness Tour was a concert tour of North America that ran from May 1978 through the rest of the year, in conjunction with the release of Springsteen's album Darkness on the Edge of Town.  (Like most Springsteen tours it had no official name, but this is the most commonly used; it is also sometimes referred to as the Darkness on the Edge of Town Tour or most simply the 1978 Tour.)

The tour has since become viewed as perhaps Springsteen's best in a storied career of concert performances.  Biographer Dave Marsh wrote in 1987, "The screaming intensity of those '78 shows are part of rock and roll legend in the same way as Dylan's 1966 shows with the Band, the Rolling Stones' tours of 1969 and 1972, and the Who's Tommy tour of 1969: benchmarks of an era."

Itinerary
The tour ran in one continuous motion, starting May 23, 1978 at Shea's Buffalo in Buffalo, New York and playing halls, theatres, and occasional arenas across the United States and back several times, with a couple of forays into Canada. The first eight shows were played before the Darkness album was released on June 2. Big cities, secondary cities, and college towns were all visited.  A few shows were cancelled due to sickness but were made up later in the run.  The tour wrapped up, after 115 shows, on New Year's Day 1979 in Cleveland, Ohio's Richfield Coliseum.

After a brief, unpleasant 1975 touring experience in Europe after the release of Born to Run, and with the weaker commercial appeal of Darkness compared to its predecessor, Springsteen did not venture overseas on this tour.

The show
The 1978 shows were longer than in previous Springsteen tours, typically around 25 songs, but they were not yet the true marathon concerts that would occupy the River and Born in the U.S.A. Tours. Nor was the set list variety that great among Springsteen songs, as his career was not yet long enough to offer the old rarities surprises of the later Reunion Tour and those that followed.

Rather, the word that almost every account of the 1978 shows uses, is intense.  "Badlands" often opened, with the verses being taken at a much faster pace than in the studio, with drumming more active, and with Springsteen fairly spitting out the lyrics nearly ahead of the band's ability to keep up.  "Born to Run" near the end of the show was also done at breakneck speed.  In contrast, slower numbers such as "Streets of Fire" were taken even more slowly, with ghostly organ lines set off against Springsteen's growling-to-screaming vocals.

Many new Springsteen songs appeared.  Some were songs that were or soon would be big hits for others, such as "Fire" and "Because the Night".  Two new slow numbers that were immediately accessible and especially effective were aching family saga "Independence Day" and the nightmare "Point Blank", both of which would later appear on the 1980 The River album, as would several other songs first heard sporadically in 1978.

Especially notable were some of the treatments of his most famous songs.  "Prove It All Night", the failed first single from Darkness, was reshaped into an eleven-minute epic with a long, howling guitar-over-piano introduction and a frenetic organ-and-guitar-over-drums outro; this rendition would become a fan favorite still referred back to decades later.  "Racing in the Street"'s piano outro was surprise-segued into the piano intro to "Thunder Road".  On Born to Run, "Backstreets" was already a six-and-a-half minute epic tale of betrayal and loss that critic Greil Marcus had likened to The Iliad; now it was extended to eleven to thirteen minutes by way of a long, mostly soft piano-based interpolation variously known as "Baby I remember you", "Little girl don't cry" or "Sad eyes"; on some recordings the audience can be heard squealing as the emotional drama plays out, before the tempo rises, suddenly stops, and the "Hiding on the ba-ack-streets" coda kicks back in full force.  This interlude would later be used as the basis for part of "Drive All Night" on The River, but for many fans, in this extended 1978 "Backstreets" Springsteen had found the height of his performance artistry.

Throughout, the E Street Band had a powerful but almost sparse sound, with each instrument's role clearly delineated (as members were added in the 1990s and 2000s the band's sound would become bigger but lose this clarity).  In particular, Roy Bittan's piano was the musical keystone of many of the numbers.

Of course not everything in the show was moody.  The third number played was nearly always the seriocomic, crowd-involving "Spirit in the Night", and towards the end of the shows things lightened up considerably with set closer "Rosalita (Come Out Tonight)" and encores including Springsteen's classic R&B "Detroit Medley" frolic and James Brown-styled antics during Gary U.S. Bonds' party dance anthem "Quarter to Three".  Springsteen's on-stage raps and stories became a little more honest than before, with his trademark "goddamn guitar" story about the bitter conflicts with his father leavened by a hint of embrace (especially when a family member was present).

The tour also saw Springsteen headlining full-sized arenas for the first time (including New York City's Madison Square Garden), a move that he agonized over lest the increase in scale undermine his control over the audience.  The shows still translated in the larger venues, and Springsteen would play in arenas or sometimes even stadiums for decades to come.

Songs performed

Critical and commercial reception
According to the unofficial fan website Brucebase, most of the shows on the tour were sell-outs or near sell-outs; only a handful had substantial numbers of empty seats, including one in Kalamazoo, Michigan where Springsteen offered to compensate the promoter for any financial loss.  According to Lynn Goldsmith, tour photographer and Springsteen's girlfriend at the time, there were more than a few half-full venues, but Springsteen's performance level never varied no matter how many were there to watch.

Los Angeles Times critic Robert Hilburn wrote, "I realized the faith I was beginning to put in Springsteen the December day in 1978 that I drove 400 miles to Tucson, Arizona, to see him in concert [for personal reasons, not as a professional assignment]. The show was part of a short western swing near the end of the Darkness tour that skipped Los Angeles.... [a] swell of emotion came to me during Bruce's concert in Tucson ... seeing Springsteen push himself so hard on stage and listening to the eloquence of his songs made me forget about doubts and think about my own dreams again."

Lynn Goldsmith later said that the 1978 Tour was far from the stereotypical rock tour, and compared it to The Rolling Stones' 1978 American Tour which she had also covered: "With Bruce, it was no drugs, no drinking, [long] sound checks and [long] shows. With the Stones, it was no sound check, lots of parties and running off-stage as quickly as possible to catch the private plane.... During that tour, Bruce didn't have any money, period.  Instead of hanging out at discos after shows, he'd just as likely pass the time by playing pinball or watching the landscape roll by from the back of the bus."

Broadcasts and recordings

One of the reasons the 1978 Tour is so well-remembered, and often viewed as the peak of Springsteen and the E Street Band in concert, is that several complete shows were broadcast live on album-oriented rock radio stations.  These included the July 7 show at West Hollywood's The Roxy, broadcast on KMET; the August 9 show at Cleveland's Agora Ballroom, broadcast on WMMS and seven other Midwestern stations; the September 19 show at the Capitol Theatre in Passaic, New Jersey, broadcast on WNEW-FM; the September 30 show from the Fox Theatre in Atlanta, broadcast on about 20 Southeastern stations; and the December 15 show from the Winterland Ballroom in San Francisco, broadcast on KSAN-FM. These broadcasts, mixed by Jimmy Iovine, were of very high audio quality, and were heard at the time by a much larger audience than had attended the concerts.  Over the years the stations would play the broadcasts again, and many high-quality bootlegs of these shows were recorded and circulated.

A syndicated radio interview with New York disc jockey Dave Herman also included live excerpts from a July 1 Berkeley Community Theatre show, including the long "Prove It All Night"; these clips would also be heard on other radio promotional vehicles such as the King Biscuit Flower Hour.

In addition, in the early 1980s a long music video for "Rosalita" was released to MTV, from the July 8 show on this tour (filmed in its entirety) at the Arizona Veterans Memorial Coliseum in Phoenix, Arizona, that included band introductions and numerous adoring women rushing the stage.  It captured the energetic and playful side of Springsteen and the E Street Band in concert, and was the first such introduction many casual fans had. This was later included in the 1989 release  Video Anthology / 1978-88.

The 1986 Live/1975-85 box set contained nine selections from the 1978 Tour, but fans were generally dissatisfied with them, as the "Backstreets" interlude was edited out, other raps and stories were edited or spliced together from different shows, and the long "Prove It All Night" was missing altogether.  Additionally, a few of the tracks from the 1978 contained overdubs recorded at the Hit Factory during 1986.

In 2006, Springsteen manager Jon Landau indicated that a full-length filmed concert DVD from the Darkness Tour might be in the offing, following a similar release for a 1975 Born to Run tour show.  Fans speculated heavily about such a possibility.  It finally materialized in November 2010 with the release of The Promise: The Making of "Darkness On the Edge of Town", an elaborate box set that included a DVD containing a house recording of the full December 8, 1978, show from Houston's The Summit arena.

Several shows were released as part of the Bruce Springsteen Archives:
 Berkeley, July 1, 1978, released June 18, 2021
 The Roxy, July 7, 1978, released July 6, 2018.
 The Agora, Cleveland 1978, released December 23, 2014.
 September 19, 1978 (Capitol Theatre, Passaic, NJ), released September 6, 2019.
 Capitol Theatre, Passaic, NJ, September 20, 1978, released December 22, 2017.
 September 30, 1978 (Fox Theatre, Atlanta, GA), released October 9, 2020.
 Atlanta, Oct 1, 1978, released October 7, 2022.
 The Summit, Houston, TX December 8, 1978, released September 21, 2017. 
 Winterland 12/15/78, released December 20, 2019.
 Winterland 12/16/78, released December 20, 2019.

Personnel
 Bruce Springsteen – lead vocals, guitars, harmonica
 Roy Bittan – piano, background vocals
 Clarence Clemons – saxophone, percussion, background vocals, clarinet
 Danny Federici – organ, electronic glockenspiel, accordion
 Garry Tallent – bass guitar
 Steven Van Zandt – guitars, background vocals
 Max Weinberg – drums

Tour dates

Cancellations and rescheduled shows

Sources
 The Light in Darkness: Limited edition book featuring original stories and photos from this iconic 1978 album and tour. The Light in Darkness celebrates this classic record.   
 Born in the U.S.A. Tour (tour booklet, 1984), Springsteen chronology.   
 Hilburn, Robert. Springsteen. Rolling Stone Press, 1985. .   
 Graff, Gary. The Ties That Bind: Bruce Springsteen A to E to Z. Visible Ink Press, 2005. .   
 Marsh, Dave. Glory Days: Bruce Springsteen in the 1980s. Pantheon Books, 1987. .   
 Roger Catlin, "Capturing The Boss' Spirit of '78", Hartford Courant, May 5, 2000.   
 Killing Floor's concert database gives valuable coverage as well, but also does not support direct linking to individual dates.   
 Brucebase's concert descriptions even more valuable coverage   
   

Bruce Springsteen concert tours
1978 concert tours